Enid Hartle (16 December 1935 – 1 December 2008) was born in Sheffield and studied singing first at the Guildhall School of Music and Drama and later with Vera Rózsa, with whom she had a long and fruitful relationship.

Operatic career

Enid Hartle's early appearances included Mrs Grose "a firmly sketched-in portrait of a comfortable old woman out of her depth" in The Turn of the Screw in London.

She began singing in the chorus of Glyndebourne Festival Opera in 1968 and the following year made her debut on the Glyndebourne Tour, singing Filipyevna in Eugene Onegin by Tchaikovsky. This role was to take her to, among other places, Toronto, Amsterdam, and The Royal Opera House in London. She also took part in the Decca recording of Eugene Onegin, under the direction of Georg Solti.

She was a lyric character mezzo-soprano and was employed by Glyndebourne both in the main season and on the tour for many years, where her roles included:
La Natura and L'Eternità in La Calisto – Cavalli 
Dryade in Ariadne auf Naxos – Strauss 
Third Lady in The Magic Flute – Mozart
Forester's wife, Owl, Woodpecker in The Cunning Little Vixen – Janáček
The Fortune Teller in Arabella – Strauss
Florence in Albert Herring – Benjamin Britten
Baba the Turk in The Rake's Progress – Stravinsky.

She created the role of Miss Reid in Winter Cruise by Hans Henkemans which won her great praise from the Dutch press and whose "committed approach" allowed her to present act 1 "virtually a monologue for her... with consummate skill".

When not at Glyndebourne or abroad Enid sang with Kent Opera, where her roles included:
 Little Buttercup in H.M.S. Pinafore – Gilbert and Sullivan
 Arnalta in The Coronation of Poppea – Monteverdi, directed by Norman Platt
 Maddalena in Rigoletto – Verdi,
 Mistress Quickly in Falstaff – Verdi, both of these Verdi operas directed by Jonathan Miller,
 The Nurse in The Return of Ulysses - Monteverdi
 Nurse in King Priam – Tippett, directed by Nicholas Hytner,
 Auntie in Peter Grimes – Britten,
 Mrs Chin in A Night at the Chinese Opera – Judith Weir.

Many of these operas were conducted by Roger Norrington.

Enid's perceptive and sensitive interpretation of these roles, infused by her love of music and language, made the characters real. She was a keen observer of and commentator on life, and her humour and enormous sense of the ridiculous brought previously unthought-of dimensions to these roles.

One critic noted "Enid Hartle's impeccably timed and cleverly under-played Marquise de Birkenfeld ... which conquered all in the second half. Her piano accompaniment to Marie's song, at once hesitant and bold, was an especial joy, while the agonised examination of her music when Marie and Sulpice broke into the Song of the Regiment roused gales of delighted laughter from the audience."

Concerts and recordings

Although primarily a stage performer, Enid Hartle also sang with many of the leading orchestras at home and abroad, with whom she performed a wide range of works from Handel's Messiah to Berlioz’ Nuits d'Été and Schönberg's Pierrot Lunaire.

In 1973 she took part in a rare performance of van Dieren's Symphony from the Chinese for the BBC in Manchester, conducted by Myer Fredman.

Her recordings include: Ariadne auf Naxos by Strauss with Georg Solti; Suor Angelica by Puccini with Richard Bonynge, La Calisto by Monteverdi realized and conducted by Raymond Leppard, Robinson Crusoe by Offenbach with Alun Francis, and Eugene Onegin by Tchaikovsky with Georg Solti.

On video she appeared in Gilbert & Sullivan's The Sorcerer in 1982, as the Nurse in the Kent Opera King Priam in 1985, and in Tchaikovsky's Queen of Spades from Glyndebourne in 1992.

Enid Hartle died on 1 December 2008.

References

Sources
The original of this article was compiled based on material prepared by Enid's colleagues and friends, Linda Gray and Sarah Walker.

External sources
Enid Hartle: The Singer, The Friend, The Teacher

English opera singers
Musicians from Sheffield
British mezzo-sopranos
1935 births
2008 deaths
20th-century British women opera singers